Raimo Lind is a Finnish curler.

At the national level, he is a two-time Finnish men's champion curler (1996, 1998).

Teams

References

External links

Living people
Finnish male curlers
Finnish curling champions
Year of birth missing (living people)
Place of birth missing (living people)
20th-century Finnish people